Jowkar or Javakar may refer to:
 Jowkar, Afghanistan, a village
 Jowkar, Iran, a city
 Jowkar-e Mehdi, a village in Kerman Province
 Jowkar-e Shafi, a village in Kerman Province
 Jowkar, Dehdez, a village in Izeh County, Khuzestan Province
 Jowkar, Susan, a village in Izeh County, Khuzestan Province
 Jowkar, Kohgiluyeh and Boyer-Ahmad, a village
 Jowkar, Lorestan, a village
 Jowkar District, in Iran
 Jowkar Rural District, in Iran